A Strange Woman is a 1977 Soviet drama film directed by Yuli Raizman.

Plot 
The film tells about a 33-year-old woman named Yevgeniya, who dreams of strong feelings and leaves Moscow for the province to her mother. There she gets a job and helps people. Suddenly a young man appears and falls in love with her. At first it frightened her, but after she began to realize that these feelings were mutual.

Cast 
 Irina Kupchenko as Yevgeniya Mihaylovna
 Yuri Podsolonko as Andrey Lebedev (as Yu. Podsolonko)
 Vasiliy Lanovoy as Nikolay Andrianov (as V. Lanovoy)
 Oleg Vavilov as Yura Agapov (as O. Vavilov)
 Antonina Bogdanova
 Tatyana Govorova as Tamara
 Valeriy Todorovskiy as Volodya (as V. Todorovskiy)
 Svetlana Korkoshko as Viktoriya Anatolievna (as S. Korkoshko)
 Mikhail Bovin
 Stepan Bubnov

References

External links 
 

1977 films
1970s Russian-language films
Soviet drama films
1977 drama films